Genevieve Goes Boating is a 2012 short film directed by Lucy Gray and narrated by Tilda Swinton.  It is Gray's directorial debut.

Cast
Tilda Swinton as Narrator

References

External links
 

2012 films
2012 short films
American short films
2012 directorial debut films
2010s English-language films